Rocetelion is a genus of flies belonging to the family Keroplatidae.

The species of this genus are found in Europe and Northern America.

Species
Rocetelion fasciolum (Coquillett, 1894)
Rocetelion fenestralis (Fisher, 1938)
Rocetelion humerale (Zetterstedt, 1850)

References

Keroplatidae
Diptera of North America
Diptera of Europe